Page\Park Architects was established in 1981 by David Page and Brian Park and has developed as one of Scotland's best known practices undertaking work over a range of sectors.

With over 150 national and international design awards since its inception in 1981, Page\Park has won the Carbon Trust Award in Scotland twice, and has been shortlisted for the RIAS Andrew Doolan Award for Architecture four times, winning once in 2006 for the Maggie's Centre Highlands and receiving a Special Commendation in 2010 for the McManus Galleries.

In 2005, the Scottish architecture magazine Prospect published a list of the 100 best modern Scottish buildings, as voted for by its readers, which featured six Page\Park projects.

In 2010, Page\Park were 93rd in the Architects Journal top 100 architectural practices in the United Kingdom. In 2014 they had risen to 71 and had won the AJ100 Best Place to Work Award 2014. In December 2013 they became an employee owned business.

Following the 2018 fire which largely destroyed Charles Rennie Mackintosh's Glasgow School of Art building, Page\Park received press attention and criticism from Members of the Scottish Parliament for their role in its restoration.

Notable projects

Completed projects

The Lighthouse, Glasgow, Scotland
Maggie's Centre, Inverness, Scotland
Maggie's Centre, Glasgow, Scotland
National Museum of Rural Life
Rowardennan Field station, Scotland
Aqualibrium Campbeltown, Kintyre, Scotland
Gorbals housing, Glasgow, Scotland
Eden Court Theatre, Inverness, Scotland
Carnegie United Kingdom Trust Headquarters, Scotland
1967-1969 Dumbarton Road, Glasgow, Scotland
Fettes Prep School, Edinburgh, Scotland
Loch Lomond and the Trossachs Headquarters, Scotland
Fraser Building, Glasgow, Scotland
Linburn Centre, Wilkieston, West Lothian
McManus Galleries, Dundee
Bluebell Views Student Residences, University of Warwick, England
Rosslyn Chapel, Scotland
Olympia Theatre, Bridgeton, Scotland
Theatre Royal Extension, Glasgow
The West End Medical Practice, West End, Edinburgh.

Ongoing and future projects

Scottish Power Headquarters, Glasgow
Kelvin Hall Redevelopment, Glasgow
Laurieston Housing Development, Glasgow
Refurbishment of the David Hume Tower, Edinburgh

Awards (since 2006)

2006

RIBA Awards - Maggie's Centre Highlands
Glasgow Institute of Architects Award - Maggie's Centre Highlands
Glasgow Institute of Architects - Commendation - Friary Court, Gorbals
Copper in Architecture Awards 12 : UK Architectural Design Award - Commended - Maggie's Centre Highlands
Craftsmanship Award - Maggie's Centre Highlands
International Architecture Award awarded by the Chicago Athenaeum - Maggie's Centre Highlands
Scottish Design Awards : Northern Exposure category - Maggie's Centre, Highlands
Andrew Doolan Scottish Building of the Year Award - Maggie's Centre, Highlands
RICS Scotland sustainability Award - Queen Mother Building, Dundee
Scottish Design Award Commendation - Queen Mother Building, Dundee
INCA (Supreme Award) - Queen Mother Building, Dundee
Dundee Civic Trust Award - Queen Mother Building, Dundee
Dundee Institute of Architects Award - Commendation - Queen Mother Building, Dundee

2007

Scottish Awards for Planning - Aqualibrium, Campbeltown
Civic Trust Award - Aqualibrium, Campbeltown
Scottish Design Award - Aqualibrium, Campbeltown
Carbon Trust Low Carbon Building Award - University Field Station, Rowardennan
RICS Scotland sustainability Award - Commendation - University Field Station, Rowardennan
Scottish Design Award Commendation - University Field Station, Rowardennan
Green Apple Sustainability Award - University Field Station, Rowardennan
BIFM Award, New Build Category - University Field Station, Rowardennan

2008

Scottish Design Awards:Best Re-use of a Listed Building - Commendation - Eden Court Theatre
IAA Award Commendation Best New Building, Highlands & Islands - Eden Court Theatre
RICS Scotland Community Benefit Award - Eden Court Theatre
GIA Award – Sustainability - Eden Court Theatre
GIA Award – Leisure - Eden Court Theatre
Saltire Society Housing Design Award - Waddell Street/Ballater Street
CIOB Scotland Good Building Award - Waddell Street/Ballater Street
GIA Award Residential - Commendation - Dumbarton Road, Yoker
GIA Award Office/Commercial - Andrew Carnegie House, Dunfermline
Scottish Award for Quality in Planning - Carrochan, Balloch
Natural Stone Award - Carrochan, Balloch
NFRC Roofing Award - Carrochan, Balloch

2009

Carbon Trust, Low Carbon Building Award - Carrochan, Balloch
British Council for Offices Award 2009 – Carrochan, Balloch
Regional Winner British Council for Offices Award 2009 – Carrochan, Balloch
National Winner RIBA GAI Sustainability Award - Carrochan, Balloch
RICS Scotland Sustainability Award (high commendation) - Carrochan, Balloch
Scottish Design Awards 2009, Engineering Design Award - Carrochan, Balloch
Scottish Design Awards 2009, Best Public Building  - Commendation - Carrochan, Balloch
Scottish Design Awards 2009, Sustainability Award – Commendation - Carrochan, Balloch
ACE Engineering Excellence Awards 2009 – Building Services Award - Carrochan, Balloch
Roses Design Awards 2009 – Silver Award, Engineering Design Category - Carrochan, Balloch		
GIA Award 2009 – Public Building Category - Fettes College Prep School
RIBA Award 2009 - Moore Street Housing
Scottish Design Award 2009 – Moore Street Housing
Roses Design Awards 2009 – Moore Street Housingory
GIA Award 2009 – Housing Category - Moore Street Housing

2010

Civic Trust Award 2010 – Commendation	Fraser Building, University of Glasgow
Civic Trust Award 2010 – Commendation	Carrochan, Balloch
RICS Award Highly Commended Conservation McManus Galleries, Dundee		
Andy Doolan Award 2010 – Special mention - McManus Galleries, Dundee
Dundee Institute of Architects Awards 	McManus Galleries, Dundee 2010, Winner - Best Regeneration/Conservation Project				
Dundee Institute of Architects Awards 	McManus Galleries, Dundee 2010, Winner - Best Interior Design
Dundee Institute of Architects Awards 	McManus Galleries, Dundee 2010, Winner - Best Public/Commercial Project
Dundee Institute of Architects Awards 	McManus Galleries, Dundee 2010, Winner of the Supreme Award
Dundee Civic Trust Award 2010 		McManus Galleries, Dundee
Glasgow Institute of Architects Awards 	McManus Galleries, Dundee 2010, Winner Conservation Award 2010
Saltire Society Engineering Awards, 2010 – Conservation Award Commendation		McManus Galleries, Dundee

2011

AJ 100 Best Practice in Scotland 		Page \ Park Architects
Civic Trust Award 2011 for Conservation, McManus Galleries, Dundee
Civic Trust Award 2011: Special Award for Restoration and Refurbishment, McManus Galleries, Dundee
Scottish Design Awards 2011, Conservation	McManus Galleries, Dundee
Scottish Design Awards 2011, Public Realm	 Albert Square, Dundee
RIBA Award 2011				McManus Galleries, Dundee
RIBA Award 2011				Centre for Scottish War Blinded, Linburn
Scottish Design Award 2011, Commendation – Engineering Design, Centre for Scottish War Blinded, Linburn
GIA Design Award, Conservation		St. Andrews Cathedral, Glasgow
GIA Design Award, Small Projects		St. Paul's Church, Shettleston
GIA Design Award, Healthcare		Centre for Scottish War Blinded, Linburn
West Lothian Council Good Access Award	Centre for Scottish War Blinded, Linburn

2012

AJ 100 Best Practice in Scotland - Page \ Park Architects
Scottish Design Awards Practice of the Year Award - Page \ Park Architects
RICS Award 2012, Conservation Category - St Andrew's Cathedral
RICS Award 2012, Innovation and Technology Category - Centre for Scottish War Blinded
RICS Building of the Year Award 2012	 Centre for Scottish War Blinded
Scottish Design Awards 2012 Leisure /Culture Building, Scottish National Portrait Gallery
Scottish War Blinded Centre, Linburn	RICS Award 2012 – Building of The Year Award
RIAS Award 2012				Scottish National Portrait Gallery
RIBA Award 2012				Scottish National Portrait Gallery
GIA Conservation Award 			Scottish National Portrait Gallery
Special Mention for the Andy Doolan Award 	Scottish National Portrait Gallery
Civic Trust Highly Commended		Fair Maid's House
GIA Commendation				Fair Maid's House
Perth Civic Trust Award			Fair Maid's House
Carbon Trust Low Carbon Building Award	Scottish National Portrait Gallery

2013

AJ 100 Best Place to Work Award 		Page \ Park Architects
RICS Scotland Awards 2013, Building Conservation Award, Scottish National Portrait Gallery
RICS Scotland Awards 2013, Scotland Project of the Year Award,	Scottish National Portrait Gallery
RICS West Midlands Awards 2013, Bluebell Views, Residential Category
Lighting Design Awards 2013, Highly Commended in Public Buildings category, Scottish National Portrait Gallery
UK Property Award 2013			Scottish National Portrait Gallery
Civic Trust Award				Scottish National Portrait Gallery

2014

AJ 100 Employer of the Year Award 2014	Page \ Park Architects
GIA Conservation Award 2014		Kelvingrove Bandstand
Glasgow Herald Property Awards 2014	Kelvingrove Bandstand
GIA Education Award 2014-Commendation 	50 George Square

2016
RIAS Andrew Doolan Best Building in Scotland Award

References

External links
Page \ Park Architects website
Page \ Park Architects Twitter

Architecture firms of Scotland
Companies based in Glasgow
Design companies established in 1981
1981 establishments in Scotland